Yakov Isaevich Neishtadt (also transliterated Jakov Isajevich Nejstadt; born 6 October 1923 in Moscow) is a Russian (formerly Soviet), now Israeli chess player and author.

Biography
During the Second World War he was a lieutenant commander of a rifle platoon. He participated in the battles of Kharkov, Krivoy Rog, Kirovograd, and Moldova, and was wounded twice, in 1942 and 1944.

Neishtadt played chess at master level during the 1950s and 1960s, and was awarded the Soviet Master of Sport title in 1961. He was also awarded the title of Judge of the All-Union Category for Chess in 1975. He was executive secretary of the magazine Shakhmaty v SSSR from 1955 to 1973 and deputy editor, then editor in chief of 64 magazine from 1974 to 1979. He has written books on a variety of chess-related topics, including openings, combinations and chess history. He also served as general editor for Sportverlag publishers of Berlin, collaborating with Mark Taimanov among others, producing a series of German-language opening theory books in the 1970s and 1980s. 

He has also been a strong correspondence chess player, heading the USSR 'B' team in the 7th and 8th correspondence chess olympiads. Between 1984 and 1991 he played in the 12th World Correspondence Chess Championship finals, finishing in 7th place behind Grigory Sanakoev. Following this he was awarded the ICCF International Master title; in 2003 this title was upgraded to that of Senior International Master.

Books
Shakhmaty do Steinitsa (Chess before Steinitz) (1961)
Prinyati Ferzevy Gambit (Queen's Gambit Accepted) (1965); English edition 1997, Cadogan
Otkazanny Ferzevy Gambit : Klassicheskaya Zashchita 2 ... e7-e6 (Queen's Gambit Declined : Classical Defence 2...e6) (1967)
Katalanskoye Nachalo (Play the Catalan) (1969);  English edition 1987, Pergamon
Pervya Champion Mira (The First World Champion) (1971)
250 Lovushek i Kombinatsii (250 Traps and Combinations) (1973)
Nekorovannye Championy (Uncrowned Champions) (1975)
Po Sledam Debyutnykh Katastrof (Catastrophe in the Opening) (1979); English edition 1980, Pergamon
Shakmatny Praktikum (Practical Chess) (1980)
Test Your Tactical Ability (1981), Batsford
Shakhmatny Universitet Paulya Keresa (Paul Keres, Chess Master Class) (1982); English edition 1983, Pergamon
Siegbert Tarrasch (1983)
Zhertva Ferzya (Queen Sacrifices) (1989); English edition 1991, Pergamon
Your Move! (1990), Batsford (UK) and Collier (USA)
Attacking the King (1991), Collier
Winning Quickly with White (1996), Cadogan
Winning Quickly with Black (1996), Cadogan
Win in the Opening! Opening Mistakes and How to Punish Them (1997), Cadogan
Improve Your Chess Tactics (2012), New in Chess

References

External links
 

1923 births
Russian chess players
Soviet chess players
Israeli chess players
Russian chess writers
Living people
Russian emigrants to Israel
Soviet military personnel of World War II